Local transport bodies are partnerships of local authorities in England outside Greater London. There are 38 local transport bodies. They cover similar areas to local enterprise partnerships, but are not permitted to overlap each other. Decision making for major transport infrastructure spending is devolved to these bodies from the Department for Transport. They will receive funding from April 2015.

Membership
Membership of local transport bodies include non-metropolitan local transport authorities (county councils and unitary authorities) or combined authorities and integrated transport authorities which cover metropolitan areas. Local enterprise partnerships are also members of local transport bodies.

List of local transport bodies

NORTH WEST

Cumbria Local Transport Body
Transport for Lancashire
Liverpool City Region Local Transport Body (LCRCA)
Greater Manchester Local Transport Body (GMCA)
Cheshire and Warrington Local Transport Body
Without Halton.

NORTH EAST

North East Local Transport Body (NECA and NTCA)
Tees Valley Local Transport Body (TVCA)

YORKSHIRE AND THE HUMBER

North Yorkshire Local Transport Body
Without York, Stockton-on-Tees (part), Middlesbrough and Redcar and Cleveland.
West Yorkshire and York Local Transport Body
West Yorkshire and York, in North Yorkshire, and eventually Barnsley, in South Yorkshire, and Craven, Harrogate and Selby, in North Yorkshire.
Sheffield City Region Local Transport Body
South Yorkshire, and eventually Bassetlaw, in Nottinghamshire, and Bolsover, Chesterfield and North East Derbyshire, in Derbyshire, without Derbyshire Dales.
Humber Local Transport Body
East Riding of Yorkshire, Kingston upon Hull, North Lincolnshire and North East Lincolnshire.

WEST MIDLANDS

The Marches Local Transport Body
Salop and Herefordshire.
Stoke-on-Trent & Staffordshire Local Transport Body
Black Country Strategic Transport Board
Wolverhampton, Walsall, Dudley and Sandwell, in West Midlands.
Greater Birmingham & Solihull Local Transport Board
Birmingham and Solihull, in West Midlands, and eventually East Staffordshire, Cannock Chase, Lichfield and Tamworth, in Staffordshire,and Wyre Forest, Bromsgrove and Redditch, in Worcestershire.
Coventry & Warwickshire Local Transport Body
Worcestershire Local Transport Body

EAST MIDLANDS

D2N2 Local Transport Board
Derbyshire and Nottinghamshire.
D2N2: Derby+Derbyshire+Nottingham+Nottinghamshire.
Leicester and Leicestershire Transport Board
Lincolnshire Strategic Transport Board
Without / Eventually North Lincolnshire and North East Lincolnshire.
Northamptonshire Local Transport Body

SOUTH WEST

Gloucestershire Local Transport Board
Without South Gloucestershire.
Swindon and Wiltshire Local Transport Body
West of England Local Transport Body (WECA)
Avon or Bristol City Region.
With North Somerset.
Dorset Local Transport Body
Heart of the South West Local Transport Board
Devon and Somerset, without North Somerset and Bath and North East Somerset.
Cornwall and Isles of Scilly Local Transport Board

SOUTH EAST

Oxfordshire Local Transport Board
Buckinghamshire Local Transport Body
Without Milton Keynes.
Berkshire Local Transport Body
Enterprise M3 Local Transport Body
New Forest, Test Valley, Winchester, East Hampshire, Basingstoke and Deane, Hart and Rushmoor, in Hampshire,and Waverley, Guildford, Woking, Surrey Heath, Runnymede, Spelthorne and Elmbridge, in Surrey.
M3 Corridor (Hampshire and Surrey).
Solent Local Transport Body
Isle of Wight, and Southampton, Eastleigh, Fareham, Gosport, Portsmouth and Havant, in Hampshire.
Coast to Capital Local Transport Body
Mole Valley, Epsom and Ewell, Reigate and Banstead, and Tandridge, in Surrey; West Sussex; Brighton and Hove, in East Sussex,and eventually Croydon, in Greater London, and Lewes, in East Sussex.

EAST ENGLAND

Greater Cambridge and Greater Peterborough Local Transport Body
Rutland and Cambridgeshire, and eventually King's Lynn and West Norfolk, in Norfolk, Forest Heath and St Edmundsbury, in Suffolk,Uttlesford, in Essex, and North Hertfordshire, in Hertfordshire.
Norfolk and Suffolk Local Transport Body
South East Midlands Local Transport Board
Bedfordshire and Milton Keynes, in Buckinghamshire, and eventually Aylesbury Vale, in Buckinghamshire, Cherwell, in Oxfordshire,and South Northamptonshire, Northampton, Daventry, Kettering and Corby, in Northamptonshire.
Hertfordshire Local Transport Body

SOUTH EAST & EAST ENGLAND

South East Local Transport Board
East Sussex, Kent and Essex, without Brighton and Hove.

LONDON

None

References

Transport in England
Local government in England